Joel Jackson is an Australian actor and musician.  He came to prominence for his performances as Charles Bean in Deadline Gallipoli and Peter Allen in Peter Allen: Not the Boy Next Door. For both roles he was nominated for the 2015 AACTA Award for Best Lead Actor in a Television Drama, winning for Peter Allen. Since 2019 he has co-starred as Detective James Steed in Ms. Fisher's Modern Murder Mysteries.

Early life
Jackson was born in Albany, Western Australia.

When Jackson was 10, his family moved nearly 2000 km north to Karratha after his father was offered a job as the primary school principal. He became head boy at Karratha Senior High School. At 17, Jackson went on a year-long Rotary exchange to Brazil. He returned home with a large circle and symbol tattooed under his left biceps.

Jackson initially wanted to pursue a musical career. He first began playing guitar at age 14 and supported Birds of Tokyo, Megan Washington, Diesel and Ian Moss in Karratha.
Jackson traveled to Perth to record an EP.

In 2011, Jackson moved to Sydney to join National Institute of Dramatic Art (NIDA). He graduated from NIDA in 2013 and returned to the metalwork factories and engineering workshops of Karratha.

Career
In 2014, Jackson auditioned for a single  scene role in the mini-series Deadline Gallipoli but was later offered the lead part of Charles Bean alongside Sam Worthington, which aired on Foxtel's  Showcase in April 2015.
In September 2015, Jackson starred as Peter Allen in the 2-part -mini-series of his life titled Peter Allen : Not the Boy Next Door. 
In December 2015, at the Australian Academy of Cinema and Television Arts Awards, Jackson won best lead actor in a television drama for his role as Allen. In May 2016, at the 58th Annual Logie Awards, Jackson won Most Outstanding Newcomer  for his role as Allen.

In February 2017, Jackson will star alongside Heidi Arena in the Melbourne Theatre Company's performance of Born Yesterday.

In December 2018, Jackson released season one of his podcast the Good Thief
in which he interviews some of Australians including Jack Ellis, Anna McGahan, Glendon Ivan, and Samuel Johnson.

In 2019, Jackson plays Detective James Steed in Ms Fisher's Modern Murder Mysteries. Also in 2019 Jackson will play alongside Harry Potter's Miriam Margolyes, and Australian actors Richard Roxburgh and Deborah Mailman, in the role of Rich Uncle Brian in H Is for Happiness.

Filmography

Film

Television

Theatre

Awards and nominations

References

External links
 

Living people
AACTA Award winners
Male actors from Western Australia
Australian male television actors
Australian male stage actors
Logie Award winners
National Institute of Dramatic Art alumni
21st-century Australian male actors
People from Albany, Western Australia
Year of birth missing (living people)